Bunny Reuben (1926 – 15 February 2007) was an Indian film historian, journalist, and publicist. He wrote several books, both fictions and non-fictions, and started his career as a film-focusing journalist in the 1940s, working for several publications, including Filmfare. According to Randhir Kapoor, a son of the actor Raj Kapoor, whose biography Reuben wrote, "It is a great loss to the RK family and the film industry. He was not only a good journalist and publicist, he was a great film historian." Navras Jaat Aafreedi of the Presidency University, Kolkata described Reuben in 2016 as one of the most prominent Bene Israel figures of India.

Bibliography

References 

1926 births
2007 deaths
Indian film historians
Indian male journalists